

Background 
Shironamhin tried to compile confession, demand, rage, hope & anticipation in their self-titled album to invite a new light through old windows. From lyrical point of view, this album is more specific on topic, searching the positive sides of a negative living. Musically Shironamhin tried western classic orchestration based on violin, cello, contrabass section fused with rock guitar, bass & drums accompaniment. Shironamhin recalls all the members & persons who worked for Shironamhin once and forever, expressed their gratitude to those who carried shironamhin this long & dedicated their songs to the listeners whom shironamhin is comfortable to call friends. Shironamhin will remain untitled as always.

Synopsis 
At past projects, the band has infused traditional classical instruments such as sarod, esraj, mandira and dotara with their distinctive style of rock. In the fifth self-titled album, they have used some classical instruments will be played along with guitar, bass and drums.

Track listing

Personnel
Band personnel
 Tanzir Tuhin — Vocal
 Ziaur Rahman Zia — Bass, violin, cello
 Kazi Ahmad Shafin — Drums
 Diat Khan — Guitar
 Rashel Kabir — Keyboard

Guest personnel
 Moumon — Acoustic Guitar
 Razib — Keyboard
 Sharif — Violin

Production personnel
 Recorded and Mixed by — Ziaur Rahman Zia
 Recorded at — Studio Gaanbaz, DTM, Pray Shironamhin
 Cover — Tanzir Tuhin
 Photography — Mortuza Alom
 Graphics (Album Art) — Ziaur Rahman Zia

References 

5. Finally Released The Album Shironamhin

External links 
 

2013 albums
Bengali music
Shironamhin albums